Ascot was an electoral district of the Legislative Assembly in the Australian state of Western Australia from 1968 to 1989.

The district was based in the eastern suburbs of Perth. First contested at the 1968 state election, its first member was Merv Toms, hitherto the member for Bayswater, who finished his career as Speaker of the Assembly. He died on 8 October 1971 while exercising his casting vote for the Government on the floor of the Assembly, where the Government and Opposition were evenly divided. At the resulting by-election, 28-year-old schoolteacher Mal Bryce was elected. Bryce, who later served as Deputy Premier to Brian Burke in the Burke Ministry, held the seat until his resignation in 1988. The seat's last member was Eric Ripper, who served as Deputy Premier to both Dr Geoff Gallop and Alan Carpenter and became the member for Belmont after Ascot was abolished at the 1989 state election.

The seat was held at all times by members of the Labor Party.

Members for Ascot

Election results

Ascot
1968 establishments in Australia
1989 disestablishments in Australia
Constituencies disestablished in 1989
Constituencies established in 1968